"Gangsta Gangsta" is the second single from American hip hop group N.W.A's 1988 album, Straight Outta Compton. The song later appeared on the N.W.A Greatest Hits album and The Best of N.W.A. - The Strength of Street Knowledge.

Background 
The song conveys the dangers of living in the streets of Compton, California and South Central Los Angeles but also speaks of the appealing side of "gangsta life". The song has been covered or otherwise remade several times since its release, among them include versions done by The Game, Mack 10 and the 57th Street Rogue Dog  with Tech N9ne and a parody of the lyrics appear in "The Salaminizer" by Gwar.

The first three verses are delivered by Ice Cube. The fourth and final verse is delivered by Eazy-E. The song is interspersed with interjections from other N.W.A. members.

The song contains samples from "God Make Me Funky" by The Headhunters, "Weak At The Knees" by Steve Arrington, "My Philosophy" by Boogie Down Productions and "Be Thankful For What You Got" by William DeVaughn among others.

Track listing

Charts

References

1988 singles
1988 songs
N.W.A songs
Song recordings produced by Dr. Dre
Songs written by Ice Cube
Songs about crime
Ruthless Records singles